Ostrov is a rural locality (a village) in Sergeikhinskoye Rural Settlement, Kameshkovsky District, Vladimir Oblast, Russia. The population was 27 as of 2010.

Geography 
Ostrov is located 5 km west of Kameshkovo (the district's administrative centre) by road. Posyolok imeni Artyoma is the nearest rural locality.

References 

Rural localities in Kameshkovsky District